Casa Francisco is the third album by Brazilian band Francisco, el Hombre, released on 21 October 2021. It is their first album with bassist Helena Papini.

The album was created during a period of isolation of the members in a yellow house (the Sítio Romã, roughly translated as "Pomegranate Ranch") in Araçoiaba da Serra, and part of its production was streamed as in a reality show throughout October 2021. The idea was turning the production process into a "anti-spectacle". The band considers it "the most Francisco, el Hombre album of all", hence the inclusion of a reference to their name in the title.

The quintet compared it with their first album La Pachanga!, seeing it as more "mature" and saying that their debut was about announcing that they were "setting off to the world" and Casa Francisco was about announcing their return to home.

Background and promotion 
The album came after a period in which members invested in solo projects (Sebastianismos, by Sebastián Piracés-Ugarte; Lazúli, by Juliana Strassacapa; and Baby, by Mateo Piracés-Ugarte). Part of the songs had already been written for some time, but the group wouldn't feel ready to release them; a total of 50-60 songs were created.

The effort was financed with help from a grant by the São Paulo City Hall.

The first single to be released was "Nada Conterá a Primavera", which mixes rhythms of salsa, mambo and Latin jazz and references MST. The second single, "Olha a Chuva", came out on 30 September, featuring Dona Onete. The song was written in five minutes in an otherwise unproductive day in which a sudden rain caused the band to rush to take their clothes off the washing line. The idea of inviting Dona Onete came from the fact that she was born in Marajó Island, in which it rains every day.

The third single, "Se Nâo Fosse Por Ontem", features Rubel and speaks about the "hardships humanity has to go through in order to get here". The short track "Pele Velha", which reprises part of "Loucura", would originally close the album, but became an interlude. "Ocê" is a tribute to Andrei Martinez Kozyreff's lover.

Critical reception 

Tony Aiex, from Tenho Mais Discos Que Amigos!, considered that, in the album, the genres with which Francisco, el Hombre, works "were fused in an uniform and linear way in order to disclose the band's unique sound, an identity which has never been in such good shape."

Track listing

Personnel 
Francisco, el Hombre
 Mateo Piracés Ugarte — vocals, acoustic guitar, Pro Tools
 Sebastián Piracés Ugarte — vocals, drums
 Juliana Strassacapa — vocais, percussion
 Andrei Martinez Kozyreff — guitar
 Helena Papini — bass

Guest/session musicians
 Josyara — vocals
 Dona Onete — vocals
 Rubel — vocals
 Céu — vocals
 Isabella Salvego de Souza — ukelele
 Maicon Faquim Araki — percussion
 Giovani Alves Loner — trombone
 Douglas William Rodrigues dos Santos — trumpet
 Mariana Marinelli de Oliveira — saxophone, transversal flute 
 Max Matta — Pro Tools

Technical personnel
 Mateo Piracés Ugarte — editing
 Max Matta — recording technician and editing
 Caíque Neri Chaves — brass/wind recording technician at Estúdio Toca do Ouriço
 Pedro Garcia — mixing
 Carlos Freitas (ClassicMaster) — matering
 Helena Papini, Juliana Strassacapa, Sebastian Piracés Ugarte, Andrei Martinez Kozyreff, Mateo Piracés Ugarte, Giovani Loner — arrangements

Notes

References 

2021 albums
Francisco, el Hombre albums